The Applause Award is an international award given out by Liseberg, a theme park in Gothenburg, Sweden. It is given out every two years to the amusement park whose "management, operations and creative accomplishments have inspired the industry with their foresight, originality and sound business development." The award is a bronze statue of two clapping hands. It was designed by Astri Taube, a Swedish sculptor. The winner is chosen by a board of governors with Liseberg's CEO, Andreas Andersen, being the chairman.

It is considered by many to be the Academy Award of the amusement park industry.
In summer of 2020, it was announced that due to the COVID-19 pandemic, the upcoming award ceremony would be postponed until 2021.  However, a year later it was again announced that the award had been postponed again, and would resume normally in 2022.

Recipients

References

Awards established in 1980
1980 establishments in Sweden